The 1983–84 Vancouver Canucks season was the team's 14th in the National Hockey League (NHL).

Offseason
The Canucks had the ninth overall pick in the Entry Draft and chose right-winger Cam Neely, who had just led the Portland Winterhawks to the Memorial Cup Championship. Neely tallied 31 points and 57 penalty minutes in 56 games his rookie season.

Training camp 
The Canucks began their training camp at the Cowichan Community Centre in Duncan, on September 11th.

Regular season
The second game of the season was a wild, shoot-out affair, with the Canucks beating the Minnesota North Stars 10–9. Patrik Sundstrom scored the winning goal to go along with five assists in the game. His right winger, Tony Tanti, scored twice and added three helpers. Two nights later, in a 7–4 win over Toronto, Tanti scored three goals, all assisted by Sundstrom. The two would combine for a large piece of the Canucks' offense this season and, along with Dave "Tiger" Williams on left wing, quickly establish themselves as the club's number one line. Tanti finished with a club-record 45 goals while Sundstrom tallied six assists and seven points (both club records) in a 9–5 win in Pittsburgh on February 29, helping him in establishing a club record of 91 points. Williams again led the NHL in penalty minutes, racking up 294.

On December 10, injuries to Richard Brodeur and John Garrett forced the Canucks to give rookie goalie Frank Caprice his first NHL start against the mighty Edmonton Oilers on Hockey Night In Canada. Things didn't look good to start, when Pat Hughes beat him to the five-hole at the 16 second mark, but after that he stopped 41 of 42 shots, many coming off of the sticks of future Hall-of-Famers, and earned the game's First Star in a 3–2 victory.  Caprice then backstopped the Canucks to two more victories before suffering his first loss December 18 in Buffalo by a 3–2 score.

That game in Buffalo began an awful 3–14–2 slide. During that miserable stretch, the Canucks managed a 3–3 tie in Los Angeles on January 4, the game in which Thomas Gradin registered his 408th point as a Canuck to pass Don Lever as the club's all-time leading scorer.  In the next three games, the Canucks lost in Minnesota, Chicago, and St. Louis by identical 2–0 scores, marking the first time that the team has been shut out in three consecutive games. They did score 4 in the next game they played, though, in a 6-4 loss at the Washington Capitals, to end the goal drought at 223 minutes and 10 seconds, which stood for 32 years as the franchise record. On January 26, following a game in which the Canucks lost 6–4 to Edmonton after leading 4–2 (Wayne Gretzky recorded a point in his 51st straight game—the last game of his NHL record scoring streak), Roger Neilson was fired as coach.  GM Harry Neale took over for the remainder of the season.

The club won its first game under Neale, 4–0 over Philadelphia, thanks to a great performance by Brodeur and two points from Jean-Marc Lanthier in his NHL debut. They played respectably in the last 29 games (15–11–3) and finished with 73 points—in a tie for third place with Winnipeg. The Canucks, with more wins (32–31), won the tiebreaker and drew Calgary, again, as a first-round playoff opponent.

Final standings

Schedule and results

Pre-season
The Canucks released their pre-season schedule on June 16, 1983.

Regular season
The Canucks released their regular season schedule on August 9th, 1983.

Playoffs
This series between the Calgary Flames and Vancouver Canucks followed a similar script as in 1983.

The Flames won the first two games at the Saddledome by 4-2 and 5-3 scores before the series shifted to Vancouver. In the third game, Doug Halward became the fifth defenseman ever to register a playoff hat-trick (and the first Canuck player to do so) as the Canucks thrashed the Flames 7-0; Brodeur got the shutout. Game Four was a one-sided affair in favour of the Flames in which Paul Reinhart became the sixth defenseman to record a playoff hat-trick. 5-1 was the score.

Player statistics

Awards and records

Transactions

Draft picks
Vancouver's draft picks at the 1983 NHL Entry Draft held at the Montreal Forum in Montreal, Quebec.

Farm teams
Fredericton Express, AHL (shared with Quebec).

See also
1983–84 NHL season

References

External links

Vancouver Canucks seasons
Vancouver C
Vancouver